Layne is both a surname and a given name. Notable people with the name include:

Surname:
 Bobby Layne (1926–1986), American football player
 David Layne (born 1939), British soccer player for Sheffield Wednesday
 Jerry Layne (born 1958), Major League Baseball umpire
 Justin Layne (born 1998), American football player
 Kenny Layne (born 1981), Professional wrestler
 Lancelot Layne (died 1990), Trinidadian rapper
 Marcia Layne, British playwright 
 Oscar Willis Layne (born 1918), Panamanian cyclist
 Raheem Layne (born 1999), American football player
 Shontelle Layne (born 1985), Barbadian singer
 Tamrat Layne (born 1995), Ethiopian politician

Given name:
 Layne Abeley, character from Lisi Harrison's The Clique Series.
 Layne Beachley, seven time women's surf World Champion
 Layne Flack, poker professional
 Layne Redmond. American drummer, writer and teacher
 Layne Staley, lead singer of Alice in Chains
 Stacy Layne Matthews, American drag queen

See also
 "Arnold Layne", song by Pink Floyd